The IntelliStation was originally a workstation-class personal computer announced in March 1997 developed by IBM as the follow-on to the PC Series 360 and 365. Certain IntelliStation M Pro Series were near hardware identical to low end IBM Netfinity 1000 Series network servers (with variants in included video cards and SCSI options). In February 2002, POWER processor-based workstations, previously sold directly under the eServer pSeries brand, were also placed under the IntelliStation umbrella.

The last IntelliStation models were discontinued in January 2009, ending the product line.

IntelliStation Pro
Intel or AMD processor based workstations, discontinued in March 2008.

IntelliStation A Pro
Type 6224 (March 2004 to July 2005)
 Dual AMD Opteron Models 244, 246, 248, 250 and 256 (no dual-core support)
 Up to 16 GB PC3200 memory
 Ultra320 SCSI or SATA150 HDD
 10/100/1000 Mbit Ethernet
 Graphic adapter options:
 Nvidia Quadro NVS 280
 Nvidia Quadro FX 1100
 Nvidia Quadro FX 3000
 Nvidia Quadro FX 4000

Type 6217 (April 2005 to April 2007)
 Dual AMD Opteron Models 250, 252, 254, 256 or dual-core Model 275, 280 or 285
 Up to 16 GB PC3200 memory
 Ultra320 SCSI or SATA150 HDD
 10/100/1000 Mbit Ethernet
 Graphic adapter options:
 Nvidia Quadro NVS 280
 Nvidia Quadro NVS 285
 Nvidia Quadro FX 1400
 Nvidia Quadro FX 1500
 Nvidia Quadro FX 3400
 Nvidia Quadro FX 3500
 Nvidia Quadro FX 4500
 Nvidia Quadro FX 4500 X2
 3DLabs Wildcat Realizm 800

IntelliStation E Pro
Type 6893 (June 1998 to June 1999)
 Intel Pentium II at 350, 400 or 450 MHz (100 MHz FSB)
 Up to 384 MB PC100 memory
 Ultra Wide SCSI or ATA HDD
 10/100 Mbit Ethernet
 Graphic adapter options:
 Matrox Millennium II
 Matrox Millennium G200
 3DLabs Permedia 2A

Type 6893 (March 1999 to June 2000)
 Intel Pentium III at 450, 500, 550 or 600 MHz (100 MHz FSB)
 Up to 768 MB PC100 memory
 Ultra Wide SCSI or ATA HDD
 10/100 Mbit Ethernet
 Graphic adapter options:
 Matrox Millennium G200
 Matrox Millennium G400
 IBM/Diamond Fire GL1 graphics adapter
 Appian J Pro

Type 6867 (November 1999 to November 2000)
 Intel Pentium III at 600, 667, 733, 866 or 933 MHz (133 MHz FSB)
 Up to 512 MB RDRAM
 Ultra-2 SCSI or ATA66 HDD
 10/100 Mbit Ethernet
 Graphic adapter options:
 Matrox Millennium G400
 ELSA GLoria II
 Appian Gemini
 IBM/Diamond Fire GL1

Type 6836–6846 (October 2000 to January 2002)
 Intel Pentium III at 800, 866, 933 MHz, or 1 GHz (133 MHz FSB)
 Up to 1.5 GB PC133 memory
 Ultra160 SCSI or ATA66 HDD
 10/100 Mbit Ethernet
 Graphic adapter options:
 Matrox Millennium G450
 Nvidia GeForce 2 MX

Type 6204–6214 (September 2001 to September 2002)
 Intel Pentium 4 at 1.6, 1.8, 2.0 or 2.2 GHz
 Up to 1.5 GB PC133 memory
 Ultra160 SCSI or ATA100 HDD
 10/100 Mbit Ethernet
 Graphic adapter options:
 Matrox Millennium G450
 Nvidia Vanta
 Nvidia GeForce2 EX
 Nvidia GeForce2 Pro
 Nvidia Quadro 4 200NVS
 ATI FireGL 8800

Type 6216–6226 (July 2002 to October 2003)
 Intel Pentium 4 at 2.0, 2.26, 2.4, 2.67 or 2.8 GHz
 Up to 2 GB PC2100 memory
 Ultra160 SCSI or ATA100 HDD
 10/100/1000 Mbit Ethernet
 Graphic adapter options:
 Matrox Millennium G450
 Nvidia Quadro 4 200NVS
 Nvidia Quadro 4 280NVS
 Nvidia Quadro 4 580XGL
 ATI FireGL 8800

IntelliStation M Pro
Type 6888 (May 1997 to July 1998)
 Intel Pentium II at 266 or 300 MHz
 Up to 512 MB EDO memory
 Ultra Wide SCSI HDD
 10/100 Mbit Ethernet
 Intergraph Intense3D Pro1000/T video adapter

Type 6898 (October 1997 to October 1998)
 Dual Intel Pentium II at 233, 266, 300 or 333 MHz
 Up to 512 MB SDRAM
 Ultra Wide SCSI or ATA33 HDD
 10/100 Mbit Ethernet
 Graphic adapter options:
 Intergraph Intense3D Pro2200/4T
 Intergraph Intense3D Pro2200/GA
 3DLabs Permedia 2

Type 6889 (July 1998 to June 1999)
 Dual Intel Pentium II at 350, 400 or 450 MHz (100 MHz FSB)
 Up to 1 GB SDRAM
 Ultra Wide SCSI or ATA HDD
 10/100 Mbit Ethernet
 Graphic adapter options:
 Matrox Millennium II
 Matrox Millennium G200
 3DLabs Permedia 2A
 Intergraph Intense3D Pro3400
 Intergraph Intense3D Pro3400/GA

Type 6889 (March 1999 to June 2000)
 Dual Intel Pentium III at 450, 500, 550 or 600 MHz (100 MHz FSB)
 Up to 1 GB SDRAM
 Ultra Wide SCSI or ATA HDD
 10/100 Mbit Ethernet
 Graphic adapter options:
 Matrox Millennium G200
 Matrox Millennium G400
 IBM/Diamond Fire GL1 graphics adapter
 Appian J Pro

Type 6889 (October 1999 to June 2000)
 Dual Intel Pentium III at 600, 667, 733, 933 MHz or 1 GHz (133 MHz FSB)
 Up to 2 GB RDRAM
 Ultra Wide SCSI or ATA66 HDD
 10/100 Mbit Ethernet
 Graphic adapter options:
 Matrox Millennium G400
 ELSA GLoria II
 Appian Gemini
 3DLabs Intense 3D Wildcat 4110
 Nvidia GeForce2 MX

Type 6849 (November 2000 to June 2002)
 Intel Pentium 4 at 1.4, 1.5, 1.7, 1.8, 2.0 or 2.2 GHz
 Ultra160 SCSI or ATA100 HDD
 Up to 2 GB RDRAM
 10/100 Mbit Ethernet
 Graphic adapter options:
 Matrox Millennium G450
 IBM/Diamond Fire GL2
 IBM/Diamond Fire GL4
 Nvidia Quadro2 MXR
 Nvidia Quadro2 Pro
 Nvidia Quadro4 200NVS
 ATI FireGL 8800
 3Dlabs Wildcat III 6110

Type 6850 (July 2001 to January 2003)

 Dual Intel Xeon at 1.5, 1.7, 2.0 or 2.8 GHz
 Ultra160 SCSI or ATA100 HDD
 Up to 4 GB RDRAM
 10/100 Mbit Ethernet
 Graphic adapter options:
 Matrox Millennium G450
 IBM/Diamond Fire GL4
 Nvidia Quadro2 Pro
 Nvidia Quadro4 200NVS
 ATI FireGL 8800
 3DLabs Wildcat III 6110

Type 6231 (November 2001 to July 2002)
 Intel Pentium 4 at 1.8 GHz
 Up to 4 GB RDRAM
 ATA100 HDD
 10/100 Mbit Ethernet
 Graphic adapter options:
 Matrox Millennium G450
 IBM/Diamond Fire GL4
 Nvidia Quadro2 Pro

Type 6233 (November 2001 to July 2002)
 Intel Xeon at 1.7 GHz
 Up to 4 GB RDRAM
 Ultra160 SCSI or ATA100 HDD
 10/100 Mbit Ethernet
 Graphic adapter options:
 Matrox Millennium G450
 IBM/Diamond Fire GL4
 Nvidia Quadro2 Pro

Type 6229 (May 2002 to February 2003)
 Intel Pentium 4 at 2.4, 2.67 or 2.8 GHz
 Ultra160 SCSI or ATA100 HDD
 Up to 2 GB RDRAM
 10/100 Mbit Ethernet
 Graphic adapter options:
 Matrox Millennium G450
 Nvidia Quadro4 200NVS
 Nvidia Quadro4 900XGL
 ATI FireGL 8800
 3DLabs Wildcat III 6110

Type 6219 (November 2002 to October 2003)
 Intel Pentium 4 at 2.4, 2.67, 2.8 or 3.06 GHz
 Up to 4 GB PC2100 memory
 Ultra320 SCSI or ATA100 HDD
 10/100/1000 Mbit Ethernet
 Graphic adapter options:
 Matrox Millennium G450
 Nvidia Quadro4 280NVS
 Nvidia Quadro4 580XGL
 Nvidia Quadro4 980XGL
 3DLabs Wildcat4 7110

Type 6220–6230 (July 2003 to March 2005)
 Intel Pentium 4 at 2.8, 3.0, 3.06, 3.2 or 3.4 GHz
 Up to 4 GB PC2700 memory
 Ultra320 SCSI, ATA100 or SATA150 HDD
 10/100/1000 Mbit Ethernet
 graphic adapter options:
 NVIDIA Quadro4 280NVS
 NVIDIA Quadro4 580XGL
 NVIDIA Quadro4 980XGL
 NVIDIA Quadro FX 500
 NVIDIA Quadro FX 1000
 NVIDIA Quadro FX 1100
 NVIDIA Quadro FX 3000

Type 6225 (October 2004 to March 2006)
 Intel Pentium 4 with Intel 64 (formerly EM64T) at 3.0, 3.2, 3.4, 3.6 or 3.8 GHz
 Up to 4 GB PC2-3200 memory
 Ultra320 SCSI or SATA150 HDD
 10/100/1000 Mbit Ethernet
 graphic adapter options:
 NVIDIA Quadro NVS 280
 NVIDIA Quadro FX 1300
 NVIDIA Quadro FX 1400
 NVIDIA Quadro FX 3400
 ATI FireGL V3100
 ATI FireGL V7100
 3DLabs Realizm 800

Type 6218 (August 2005)
 Intel Pentium 4 with Intel 64 (formerly EM64T) at 3.0, 3.2, 3.4, 3.6 and 3.8 GHz or dual-core 3.2 or 3.4 GHz
 Up to 8 GB PC2-4200 memory
 Ultra320 SCSI or SATA300 HDD
 10/100/1000 Mbit Ethernet
 graphic adapter options:
 NVIDIA Quadro NVS 280
 NVIDIA Quadro NVS 285
 NVIDIA Quadro FX 1400
 NVIDIA Quadro FX 4500
 ATI FireGL V3100
 ATI FireGL V7100
 3DLabs Realizm 800

Type 9229 (September 2006)
 Intel Core 2 Duo with E6300, E6400, E6600, E6700 or Q6600 processor
 Up to 8 GB PC2-5300 memory
 3Gbit SAS or SATA300 HDD
 10/100/1000 Mbit Ethernet
 graphic adapter options:
 NVIDIA Quadro NVS 285
 NVIDIA Quadro FX 550
 NVIDIA Quadro FX 1500
 NVIDIA Quadro FX 3500

IntelliStation R Pro
Relabeled IBM eServer xSeries 330 1U rackmount servers. Marketed towards trading floors with very limited floorspace, and wanting central management of the workstations. Remote users could be up to 500 ft (152.4 meters) away from the server.

Type 8654 (March 2001 to September 2001)
 Intel Pentium III at 1.0 GHz
 Up to 4 GB ECC SDRAM
 Ultra160 SCSI or ATA HDD
 Dual 10/100 Mbit Ethernet
 PCI Quad-port Matrox G200 MMS videocard
 PCI Audio adapter

Type 6851 (August 2001 to July 2002)
 Intel Pentium III at 1.13 or 1.26 GHz
 Up to 4 GB ECC SDRAM
 Ultra160 SCSI or ATA HDD
 Dual 10/100 Mbit Ethernet
 PCI quad-port Matrox G200 MMS videocard
 PCI audio adapter

IntelliStation Z Pro
Type 6899 (March 1997 to ??)

 Dual Intel Pentium Pro at 200 MHz 256kB/512kB L2 cache (66 MHz FSB), Pentium II Overdrive P6T ready
 Intel 440FX/82371SB chipset with DEC PCI-to-PCI bridge (spec. 2.1) and APM 1.1
 Up to 1 GB EDO memory (4 DIMM, 168 pins)
 Ultra Wide SCSI HDD (with Adaptec AHA-2940 adapter in PCI slot)
 10/100 Mbit Ethernet (with Intel EtherExpress Pro/100 adapter in PCI slot)
 Onboard audio Crystal Semiconductor (single chip)
 1 shared ISA/PCI connector, 2 dedicated ISA connectors, and 4 dedicated PCI connectors; via Riser
 Graphic adapter options:
 Matrox Millennium II (up to 8MB WRAM)
 Intergraph Intense3D Pro1000/T video adapter (16MB + 4MB)

Type 6865 (October 1998 to April 2000)
 Dual Intel Pentium II Xeon at 400, 450, 500 or 550 MHz (100 MHz FSB)
 Up to 2 GB SDRAM
 Ultra-2 SCSI HDD
 10/100 Mbit Ethernet
 Graphic adapter options:
 Matrox Millennium G200
 Matrox Millennium G400
 Intergraph Intense3D Pro3400
 Intergraph Intense3D Pro3400/GA
 IBM/Diamond Fire GL1
 3DLabs Intense 3D Wildcat 4000 (RA and GA)

Type 6866 (January 2000 to March 2002)
 Dual Intel Pentium III Xeon at 677, 733, 800, 866, 933 MHz, or 1 GHz (133 MHz FSB)
 Up to 2 GB RDRAM
 Ultra160 SCSI HDD
 10/100 Mbit Ethernet
 Graphic adapter options:
 Matrox Millennium G400
 Matrox Millennium G450
 IBM/Diamond Fire GL1
 IBM/Diamond Fire GL2
 ELSA GLoria II
 3DLabs Intense 3D Wildcat 4110
 3Dlabs Intense 3D Wildcat 4210
 NVIDIA Quadro2 MXR

Type 6894 (May 2001 to June 2002)

The only Itanium-equipped model, with the same platform as an identical Dell, Fujitsu or HP workstations, and based on a SGI reference design; the main difference between vendor variants was only a hardware support, software options and case colors.
 Dual Intel Itanium at 800 MHz
 Up to 16 GB SDRAM
 Ultra160 SCSI HDD
 10/100 Mbit Ethernet
 Graphic options:
 Matrox Millennium G450
 Nvidia Quadro2 Pro

Type 6221 (November 2002 to February 2005)

 Dual Intel Xeon at 2.4, 2.67, 2.8 or 3.2 GHz
 Up to 8 GB PC2100 memory
 Ultra320 SCSI or ATA100 HDD
 10/100/1000 Mbit Ethernet
 Graphic options (AGP-based):
 Matrox Millennium G450
 NVIDIA Quadro4 280NVS
 NVIDIA Quadro4 980XGL
 NVIDIA Quadro FX 1000
 NVIDIA Quadro FX 1100
 NVIDIA Quadro FX 3000
 3DLabs Wildcat4 7110

Type 6223 (August 2004 to March 2007)
 Dual Intel Xeon with Intel 64 (formerly EM64T) at 3.0, 3.2, 3.4, 3.6 or 3.8 GHz
 Up to 16 GB PC2-3200 memory
 Ultra320 SCSI or ATA100 HDD
 10/100/1000 Mbit Ethernet
 Graphic options (PCI-e based):
 NVIDIA Quadro4 NVS280
 NVIDIA Quadro4 NVS285
 NVIDIA Quadro FX 1300
 NVIDIA Quadro FX 1400
 NVIDIA Quadro FX 3400
 NVIDIA Quadro FX 3500
 NVIDIA Quadro FX 4500
 ATI FireGL V7100
 3DLabs Wildcat Realizm 800

Type 9228 (June 2006)
 Dual Intel Xeon Model 5130, 5140, 5150 or 5160
 Up to 32 GB PC2-5300 memory
 3Gbit SAS or SATA300 HDD
 10/100/1000 Mbit Ethernet
 graphic options (PCI-e based):
 NVIDIA Quadro NVS 285
 NVIDIA Quadro FX 550
 NVIDIA Quadro FX 1500
 NVIDIA Quadro FX 3500
 NVIDIA Quadro FX 4500

IntelliStation POWER
IBM POWER processor based workstations. The POWER 185 and 285 models were the last Power-based workstations from IBM, having been discontinued on 2 January 2009.

IntelliStation POWER 265
Type 9112-265 (February 2002 to September 2003)
 Dual POWER3-II processors at 450 MHz
 Up to 8 GB of memory
 Ultra160 SCSI HDD
 10/100 Mbit Ethernet
 Graphic adapter options:
 GXT135P (PCI-based Matrox G450 with 32 MB)
 GXT4500P
 GXT6500P

IntelliStation POWER 275Type 9114-275 (June 2003 to February 2006) Single or Dual Core POWER4+ processors at 1.0 or 1.45 GHz
 Up to 16 GB of memory
 Ultra320 SCSI HDD
 2 Ethernet ports; one 10/100 Mbit, one 10/100/1000 Mbit
 Graphic adapter options:
 GXT135P
 GXT4500P
 GXT6500P

IntelliStation POWER 285Type 9111-285 (October 2005 to January 2009) Single or Dual Core POWER5+ processor at 1.9 or 2.1 GHz
 Up to 32 GB of memory
 Ultra320 SCSI HDD
 Dual 10/100/1000 Mbit Ethernet
 Graphic adapter options:
 GXT135P
 GXT4500P
 GXT6500P

IntelliStation POWER 185Type 7047-185 (February 2006  to January 2009)'''
 Single or Dual PowerPC 970 processors at 2.5 GHz
 Up to 8 GB of memory
 Ultra320 SCSI HDD
 Dual 10/100/1000 Mbit Ethernet
 Sound Card option with Feature Code 8244
 graphic adapter options:
 GXT135P
 GXT4500P
 GXT6500P

See also 

 IBM PC Series

External links 
 IBM IntelliStation homepage
 Reference information on current IntelliStation Pro models
 Facts and Features on IntelliStation POWER models
 Processor Support Matrix for IntelliStation 6217 and 6224 Models

References 

IntelliStation
IntelliStation
PowerPC computers
Computer-related introductions in 1997